Plum Creek Township may refer to:

Plum Creek Township, Kossuth County, Iowa
Plum Creek Township, Butler County, Nebraska